Songlin is a divergent, unclassified Sino-Tibetan language spoken in Zayu County, Nyingchi Prefecture, Tibet. A linguistic description of Songlin has been published in a monograph by Song (2019).

Demographics
The language is spoken in Songlin Village 松林村, Upper Chayu Town 上察隅镇 by approximately 1,000 people. The local lingua franca of the area is the Zayu dialect of Khams Tibetan. Some Songlin speakers can speak Idu and gSerkhu, both of which are also spoken in Upper Chayu Town 上察隅镇.

Classification
Song & Lin (2020) shows that Songlin is not closely related to any of the surrounding Tibeto-Burman languages and cannot be classified as a Tibetic language. A computational phylogenetic study by Jiang (2023) also shows the divergent position of Songlin. Songlin and the Mishmi languages all are spoken in Zayu County, but Songlin is not closely related to any of them.

Sentence examples
The following Songlin sentence examples are from Yan (Song 2020:656). Songlin has SOV word order.

Vocabulary
The following are Songlin words cited from Song (2020).

References

Unclassified Sino-Tibetan languages
Languages of China
Languages of Tibet